The 1996 women's Olympic volleyball tournament was the ninth edition of the event, organised by the world's governing body, the FIVB in conjunction with the International Olympic Committee. It was held from 20 July to 3 August 1996 at the Stegeman Coliseum of The University of Georgia in Athens, Georgia and at the Omni Coliseum in Atlanta, Georgia.

Qualification

Format
The tournament was played in two different stages. A single round-robin format was played within each pool to determine the teams position in the pool.

The  was played in a single elimination format, with placement matches determining the top eight positions. Starting at the quarterfinals, winners advanced to the semifinals while losers advanced to the placement matches (5th–8th semifinal).

Pools composition

Rosters

Venues
 University of Georgia Coliseum, Athens, United States
 Omni Coliseum, Atlanta, United States

Preliminary round

Group A

|}

|}

Group B

|}

|}

Final round

Quarterfinals

|}

5th–8th places

Semifinals

|}

7th place match

|}

5th place match

|}

1st–4th places

Semifinals

|}

Bronze medal match

|}

Gold medal match

|}

Final standings

Medalists

See also
Men's Olympic Tournament

References

External links
Results
Final standings (1964–2000) at FIVB.org
Official results (pgs. 376, 405–416)

O
W
1996 in women's volleyball
Women's volleyball in the United States
Vol